Unrest, also called disaffection, is a sociological phenomenon, including:
 Civil unrest
 Civil disorder
 Domestic terrorism
 Industrial unrest
 Labor unrest
 Rebellion
 Riot
 Strike action
 State of emergency

Notable historical instances of unrest 
 19th century Luddites
 1978–79 Winter of Discontent (UK)
 1989 Purple Rain Revolt (South Africa)
 2003 Maldives civil unrest
 2004 Unrest in Kosovo
 2005 Belize unrest
 May 2005 unrest in Uzbekistan
 Arab Spring
 Post-coup unrest in Egypt (2013–14)
 2014 pro-Russian conflict in Ukraine
 2022 Kazakh unrest

See also 

 

Riots and civil disorder
Social change
Social conflict